Yangnyeom chicken is a variety of Korean fried chicken seasoned with a sweet and spicy sauce of gochujang, garlic, sugar, and other spices. It is often eaten as anju, food consumed while drinking, in South Korea.

Julia Moskin, writing for The New York Times, called yangnyeom chicken "the apotheosis of the Korean style" of fried chicken.

Etymology
The word chicken in South Korea refers to fried chicken, and sometimes roasted chicken; yangnyeom is Korean for "seasoned". Therefore, yangnyeom chicken means "seasoned fried chicken" in Korean. Unseasoned fried chicken is called dakgogi-twigim (chicken meat fritter) or fried chicken. Outside Korea, yangnyeom chicken is known as Korean fried chicken.

History

The initial developer of yangnyeom chicken, Yoon Jonggye, devised it in his restaurant called "Mek-si-can" (맥시칸, not to be confused with similar copycat brands 멕시칸 or 멕시카나), after analyzing the leftover food of his customers. He noticed that the regular fried chicken crust was too crunchy and scratched the palates of customers, so he coated the fried chicken with a sauce to soften the crust, creating the recipe for yangnyeom chicken. However, it was commercialized by Yang Heekwon, an employee of Mr Yoon, who was inspired by the recipe and founded the restaurant chain Pelicana Chicken. Initially, customers were unwilling to buy the yangnyeom chicken at first. Pelicana has then started to give free food samples to customers as part of the marketing campaign, which successfully increased the sales in just two months. A jingle in a Pelicana commercial featuring popular comedian  further contributed to the popularity of the dish. 

The naming and trademark status of yangnyeom was argued in the South Korean courts in the 1990s, culminating in a 1997 ruling by the Supreme Court.

Fried chicken became popular in South Korea in the 1970s; the first fried chicken restaurant in South Korea, Lim's Chicken, opened in 1977. Yangnyeom chicken restaurants gained in popularity and have been opened in other countries, including the United States, Australia, Taiwan, China, the Philippines, Malaysia, Myanmar, Singapore, and Vietnam.

Preparation and serving

A chicken is cut into pieces, or boneless chicken into bite-size pieces, and seasoned with salt and powdered black pepper. Sometimes cheonju (rice wine) or curry powder is added to get rid of the strong poultry smell. The seasoned chicken is coated in batter made with eggs and starch powder and deep-fried twice, with the resulting crust "thin, crackly and almost transparent," according to Moskin. The chicken is then coated with sauce. Sometimes it is sprinkled with chopped peanuts, sesame seeds, chopped garlic, or sliced green onions. Pickled radish is a common accompaniment.

The sauce is made of starch syrup or strawberry jam, ketchup, gochujang, dark soy sauce, minced garlic, ground red pepper, brown sugar, and sometimes other seasonings and boiled briefly to thicken. Commercial sauces are available.

Coating in sauce causes the crust of yangnyeom chicken to get soggy very fast; consuming it immediately after purchase is recommended unless one prefers the moist crust to the crispy one. Yangnyeom chicken tends to be popular among those who do not enjoy the oily taste of fried chicken. On the other hand, those who may not enjoy the sweetish taste and deep fried coating that gets soggy very fast prefer eating fried chicken. There are people who want both styles of chicken; the order of "banban" (half-and-half), meaning "half yangnyeom chicken, half fried chicken", is common in Korea.

The addition of the sauce makes yangnyeom chicken slightly more expensive to prepare than fried chicken. Some restaurants have attempted to cut costs by deep-frying chicken in old cooking oil or using low-quality or expired meat, using the sauce to obscure the lower quality of the completed dish.

Dietary information
According to the Korea Consumer Agency, a whole yangnyeom chicken has 2,700–2,900 calories, more than a fried chicken, because approximately 1,000 calories are added by the sauce.

See also
 Buffalo wing
 Crispy fried chicken
 Padak

Reference

External links
 

Deep fried foods
South Korean chicken dishes
Fried chicken